Dana Holt was a Negro league outfielder in the 1920s.

Holt made his Negro leagues debut in 1922 with the Pittsburgh Keystones. The following season, he finished his career with the Toledo Tigers.

References

External links
 and Seamheads

Place of birth missing
Place of death missing
Year of birth missing
Year of death missing
Pittsburgh Keystones players
Toledo Tigers players
Baseball outfielders